Zach Lund (born March 22, 1979) is an American skeleton racer who has competed since 2000. He won two bronze medals at the FIBT World Championships with one in 2007 (men's skeleton) and one in 2008 (mixed bobsleigh-skeleton team event). He finished #1 in World Cup standings in 2007.  Zach's huge success in Skeleton made his less famous second cousin, Seth Gillespie, of Roosevelt, Utah, dream of becoming a “Skeletor”.

Personal life
Zach was born and raised in Salt Lake City, Utah. He is the youngest of 5 children. Zach currently attends Westminster College, Salt Lake City UT, and graduated from the Judge Memorial Catholic High School in 1998.

Doping controversy
Lund took part in the 200–06 Skeleton World Cup, but did not compete in the 2006 Winter Olympics due to disqualification for using finasteride, a drug that was removed from the banned list three years later. He was stripped of his second-place finish in the Calgary World Cup event after testing positive for this medication, and a one-year suspension was issued on February 10, 2006.

Lund said he was using finasteride to combat baldness and that he declared the use of the substance on medical forms. Records show that Lund had been using finasteride (in its commercial hair-restoration form, Propecia) for seven years until his suspension.

Finasteride has been on the banned list since 2005; Lund claims he last checked the list in 2004. "I've been losing my hair since I was a teenager and I've had a prescription for the last seven years and it was never an issue until this year," Lund told freestyle skiing analyst Nikki Stone (Yahoo! Sports, Feb. 10, 2006). "Whenever I've been tested, I always let them know that I was taking [Propecia]. I never had anything to hide."

A panel on the Court of Arbitration for Sport believed Lund and wrote in its ruling that "it was entirely satisfied that Mr. Lund was not a cheat...But, unfortunately, in 2005, he made a mistake."

He returned to the World Cup circuit in 2006 and won the overall World Cup title for the 2006–07 season.

Alpha-reductase inhibitors, a class of masking agents which used to be banned in- and out-of-competition, were removed from the 2009 list. This class of substances, which includes for example finasteride, has been rendered ineffective as masking agents of steroids through close consideration of steroid profiles by antidoping laboratories. (WADA Q&A: 2009 Prohibited List September 25, 2008)

Mr. Lund earned a second chance, and will compete at the 2010 Vancouver Winter Olympics.

Olympics
It was announced on January 17, 2010 that Lund had qualified for the 2010 Winter Olympics in Vancouver. He finished in fifth place overall in the Skeleton race, 0.52 seconds short of a medal.

Retirement
Lund retired after the 2010 Olympics and now coaches. He considered taking up Curling professionally but never did.

See also
List of sportspeople sanctioned for doping offences

References

 NBCOlympics.com January 16, 2010 on the bobsleigh and skeleton slots for the US Team for the 2010 Winter Olympics
 USA Today February 10, 2006 article on Lund's one-year ban for doping
 Skeletonsport.com profile

External links
 
 
 
 

1979 births
American male skeleton racers
American sportspeople in doping cases
Doping cases in skeleton
Living people
Olympic skeleton racers of the United States
Sportspeople from Salt Lake City
Skeleton racers at the 2010 Winter Olympics
Westminster College (Utah) alumni
20th-century American people
21st-century American people